Al-Janadyah as-Sufla is a sub-district located in the At-Ta'iziyah District, Taiz Governorate, Yemen. Al-Janadyah as-Sufla had a population of 13,162 according to the 2004 census.

References  

Sub-districts in At-Ta'iziyah District